A songbird is a bird belonging to the suborder Passeri of the perching birds (Passeriformes). Another name that is sometimes seen as the scientific or vernacular name is Oscines, from Latin oscen, "songbird". The Passeriformes contains 5,000 or so species found all over the world, in which the vocal organ typically is developed in such a way as to produce a diverse and elaborate bird song.

Songbirds form one of the two major lineages of extant perching birds (~4,000 species), the other being the Tyranni (~1,000 species), which are most diverse in the Neotropics and absent from many parts of the world. The Tyranni have a simpler syrinx musculature, and while their vocalizations are often just as complex and striking as those of songbirds, they are altogether more mechanical sounding. There is a third perching bird lineage, the Acanthisitti from New Zealand, of which only two species remain alive today.
Some evidence suggests that songbirds evolved 50 million years ago in the part of Gondwana that later became India, Sri Lanka, Australia, New Zealand, New Guinea and Antarctica, before spreading around the world.

Description
The song in this clade is essentially territorial, because it communicates the identity and whereabouts of an individual to other birds, and also signals sexual intentions. Sexual selection among songbirds is highly based on mimetic vocalization. Female preference has shown in some populations to be based on the extent of a male's song repertoire. The larger a male's repertoire, the more females a male individual attracts. It is not to be confused with bird calls that are used for alarms and contact and are especially important in birds that feed or migrate in flocks. While almost all living birds give calls of some sort, well-developed songs are only given by a few lineages outside the songbirds. And still, not all songbirds proffer a call that is distinctly melodious. Songbirds do, however, possess a highly developed vocal organ, the syrinx, that enables their sonorous activity. This organ, also known as a song box, can be found where the windpipe meets diverging bronchial tubes which lead to the lungs. The organ is a solid, bony structure lined with a film of membranes which air passes through as the songbird calls. While the song boxes of songbirds vary in size and intricacy, this does not necessarily determine the songbird's ability to voice their song. Researchers believe this has more to do with the length of the windpipe. 

Other birds (especially non-passeriforms) sometimes have songs to attract mates or hold territory, but these are usually simple and repetitive, lacking the variety of many oscine songs. The monotonous repetition of the common cuckoo or little crake can be contrasted with the variety of a nightingale or marsh warbler. However, although many songbirds have songs that are pleasant to the human ear, this is not invariably the case. Many members of the crow family (Corvidae) communicate with croaks or screeches, which sound harsh to humans. Even these, however, have a song of sorts, a softer twitter that is given between courting partners. And even though some parrots (which are not songbirds) can be taught to repeat human speech, vocal mimicry among birds is almost completely restricted to songbirds, some of which (such as the lyrebirds or the aptly-named mockingbirds) excel in imitating the sounds of other birds or even environmental noises.

The birds from higher altitudes have evolved thicker downs (also known as jackets) to protect themselves from the changes in climate. Their feathers have outer and inner portions, with the lower down being fluffier and warmer to provide increased warmth.

Song repertoire and courtship
Sexual selection can be broken down into several different studies regarding different aspects of a bird's song. As a result, song can vary even within a single species. Many believe that song repertoire and cognition have a direct relationship. However, a study published in 2013 has shown that all cognitive ability may not be directly related to the song repertoire of a songbird. Specifically, spatial learning is said to have an inverse relationship with song repertoire. So for example, this would be an individual who does not migrate as far as others in the species, but has a better song repertoire. This suggests an evolutionary trade-off between possible alleles. With natural selection choosing traits best fit for reproductive success there could be a trade off in either direction depending on which trait would produce a higher fitness at that time period.

Song repertoire can be attributed to male songbirds as it is one of the main mechanisms of courtship. Song repertoires differ from male individual to male individual and species to species. Some species may typically have large repertoires while others may have significantly smaller ones. Mate choice in female songbirds is a significant realm of study as song abilities are continuously evolving. Males often sing to assert their dominance over other males in competition for a female, sometimes in lieu of a combative episode, and to arouse the female by announcing a readiness to mate. Though less frequent, females have also been known to sing and occasionally in duet with a mate as an affirmation of their partnership. While some will sing their song from a familiar perch, other species common to grasslands will sing a familiar song each time they fly.  Currently there have been numerous studies involving songbird repertoires, unfortunately, there has yet been concrete evidence to confirm that every songbird species prefers larger repertoires. A conclusion can be made that it can vary between species on whether a larger repertoire is connected to better fitness. With this conclusion, it can be inferred that evolution via natural selection, or sexual selection, favors the ability to retain larger repertoires for these certain species as it leads to higher reproductive success. During times of courtship, it is said that male songbirds increase their repertoire by mimicking other species songs. The better the mimicking ability, retaining ability, and the quantity of other species mimicked has been proven to have a positive relationship with mating success. Female preferences cause the constant improvement of accuracy and presentation of the copied songs. Another theory known as the "song-sharing hypothesis" suggests that females prefer simpler, more homogenous songs that signal a male of familiar territory. As birdsong can be broken into regional dialects through this process of mimicry, the foreign song of a newcomer suggests the lack of territorial possession. This can be costly in the wake of territorial conflicts between disparate songbird populations and may compel a female to prefer a male spouting a familiar song of the area.

Taxonomy and systematics
Sibley and Alquist divided songbirds into two "parvorders", Corvida and Passerida (standard taxonomic practice would rank these as infraorders), distributed in Australo-Papua and Eurasia respectively. Subsequent molecular studies, however, show this treatment to be somewhat erroneous. Passerida is a highly diverse lineage, uniting over one third of all bird species to include (in 2015) 3,885 species). These are divided into three major superfamilies (though not exactly corresponding to the Sibley-Ahlquist arrangement), in addition to some minor lineages.

In contrast, Sibley & Alquist's "Corvida" is a phylogenetic grade, and an artefact of the phenetic methodology. The bulk of the "Corvida" make up the large clade Corvides (812 species as of 2015), which is a sister group to the Passerida. The remaining 15 oscine families (343 species in 2015) form a series of basally branching sister groups to the Corvoid - Passerid clade. All of these groups, which form at least six successively branching basal clades, are found exclusively or predominantly in Australasia. Australian endemics are also prominent among basal lineages in both Corvoids and Passerids, suggesting that songbirds originated and diverged in Australia.

Scrub-birds and lyrebirds, of which there are just two species of each, represent the oldest lineage of songbirds on Earth. The rufous scrubbird, Atrichornis rufescens, is essentially confined to the Gondwana Rainforests of Australia World Heritage Area, occurring in both Queensland and New South Wales sections. It is now only found at elevations above .

Families

 Menuroidea
 Menuridae: lyrebirds
 Atrichornithidae: scrub birds
 Bowerbirds and Australian treecreepers
 Climacteridae: Australian treecreepers
 Ptilonorhynchidae: bowerbirds
 Meliphagoidea: honeyeaters and allies
 Maluridae: fairy-wrens, emu-wrens and grasswrens
 Meliphagidae: true honeyeaters and chats
 Dasyornithidae: bristlebirds
 Pardalotidae: pardalotes
 Acanthizidae: scrubwrens, thornbills, and gerygones
 Australopapuan babblers
 Pomatostomidae: Australasian babblers
 Logrunners
 Orthonychidae: logrunners
 Other basal lineages
 Cnemophilidae: satinbirds Cnemophilus and Loboparadisea
 Melanocharitidae: berrypeckers and longbills
 Callaeidae: New Zealand wattlebirds kokako, saddleback and †huia
 Notiomystidae: stitchbird
 Corvides
 Paramythiidae: tit berrypecker and crested berrypeckers
 Psophodidae: whipbirds, jewel-babblers and quail-thrushes
 Platysteiridae: wattle-eyes and batis
 Malaconotidae: bush-shrikes
 Machaerirynchidae: boatbills
 Vangidae: vangas, woodshrikes, and helmetshrikes
 Pityriasidae: Bornean bristlehead
 Artamidae: butcherbirds, currawongs and Australian magpie (formerly in Cracticidae)
 Rhagologidae: mottled whistler
 Aegithinidae: ioras
 Campephagidae: cuckooshrikes and trillers
 Mohouidae: whiteheads
 Neosittidae: sittellas
 Eulacestomidae: ploughbill
 Oreoicidae: Australo-Papuan bellbirds
 Pachycephalidae: whistlers, shrike-thrushes, pitohuis and allies
 Laniidae: shrikes
 Vireonidae: vireos
 Oriolidae: orioles, figbirds and †piopio (formerly Turnagridae)
 Dicruridae: drongos
 Rhipiduridae: fantails
 Monarchidae: monarchs and allies
 Platylophidae: jayshrike
 Corvidae: crows, magpies, and jays
 Corcoracidae: white-winged chough and apostlebird
 Melampittidae: melampittas
 Ifritidae: ifritabirds
 Paradisaeidae: birds of paradise
 Passerida
 Petroicidae: Australasian robins
 Picathartidae: rockfowl
 Chaetopidae: rockjumpers
 Eupetidae: rail-babbler
 Bombycillidae: waxwings and allies
 Ptiliogonatidae: silky-flycatchers
 Hypocoliidae: hypocolius
 Dulidae: palmchat
 † Mohoidae: some Hawaiian honeyeaters, Moho and Chaetoptila genera, not closely related to Meliphagidae
 Hylocitreidae: hylocitrea
 Stenostiridae: fairy-flycatcher and allies
 Paridae: tits, chickadees, and titmouse
 Remizidae: penduline-tits
 Nicatoridae: nicators
 Panuridae: bearded reedling
 Alaudidae: larks
 Pycnonotidae: bulbuls
 Hirundinidae: swallows and martins
 Pnoepygidae: wren-babblers
 Macrosphenidae: crombecs and African warblers
 Cettiidae: bush-warblers and allies
 Scotocercidae: streaked scrub-warbler
 Erythrocercidae: yellow flycatchers
 Aegithalidae: long-tailed tits
 Phylloscopidae: leaf-warblers and allies. Recently split from Sylviidae.
 Acrocephalidae: reed warblers and allies
 Locustellidae: grassbirds and allies
 Donacobiidae: black-capped donacobius
 Bernieridae: Malagasy warblers
 Cisticolidae: cisticolas and allies
 Timaliidae: babblers
 Pellorneidae: ground babblers
 Leiothrichidae: laughingthrushes and allies
 Sylviidae: Old World warblers
 Zosteropidae: white-eyes
 Arcanatoridae: dapple-throat and allies
 Promeropidae: sugarbirds
 Irenidae: fairy-bluebirds
 Regulidae: kinglets
 Elachuridae: elachuras
 Hyliotidae: hyliotas
 Troglodytidae: wrens
 Polioptilidae: gnatcatchers
 Sittidae: nuthatches
 Tichodromidae: wallcreeper
 Certhiidae: treecreepers
 Mimidae: mockingbirds and thrashers
 Sturnidae: starlings
 Buphagidae: oxpeckers
 Turdidae: thrushes and allies
 Muscicapidae: Old World flycatchers and chats
 Cinclidae: dippers
 Chloropseidae: leafbirds
 Dicaeidae: flowerpeckers
 Nectariniidae: sunbirds
 Passeridae: true sparrows
 Ploceidae: weavers and widowbirds
 Estrildidae: estrildid finches (waxbills, munias, etc.)
 Viduidae: indigo birds and whydahs
 Peucedramidae: olive warbler
 Prunellidae: accentor
 Motacillidae: wagtails and pipits
 Urocynchramidae: Przevalski's finch
 Fringillidae: true finches and Hawaiian honeycreepers (formerly Drepanididae)
 Parulidae: New World warblers, for example the black-throated blue warblers and allies
 Icteridae: American blackbirds, New World orioles, grackles and cowbirds.
 Coerebidae: bananaquit
 Emberizidae: buntings
Passerellidae: New World sparrows
 Thraupidae: tanagers, true honeycreepers and allies
 Calcariidae: snow buntings and longspurs
 Cardinalidae: cardinals and allies

See also
 Song system

References

Video links
 http://www.cbc.ca/natureofthings/blog/are-songbirds-disappearing
 Mockingbird singing

External links

 Oscines  Tree of Life web project article July 31, 2006.

 
 
Extant Eocene first appearances